Cycas couttsiana is a species of cycad, native to Queensland.

References

couttsiana
Flora of Queensland
Plants described in 1992